Mike Mollo (born February 11, 1980) is an American former professional boxer. A fan favorite for his aggressive style in Chicago, Mollo is perhaps best known for his bouts with Polish fighters Art Binkowski, Artur Szpilka, Andrew Golota, and Krzysztof Zimnoch. He was managed by Darnell Nicholson.

Background
Born into a working class Italian family in Chicago's south suburbs, Mollo got into numerous scuffles on the streets of his neighborhood. Already 230 pounds as a 14-year-old, he was quickly taken to the local boxing club to hone his skills, and apply his energy in a more constructive manner.

Professional career
After a brief amateur career, "Merciless" Mike Mollo made his professional debut on June 25, 2000, scoring a first-round knockout over Terry Coffin in Elgin, Illinois. Over the following years, Mollo built his professional record while also working full-time as a bricklayer and tuckpointer. Wildly popular with Chicago fight fans, Mollo used his hard-punching, aggressive style to win 19 of his first 20 professional bouts. His first loss was to heavyweight contender DaVarryl Williamson.

On October 7, 2006, Mollo scored his biggest win, knocking out Kevin McBride (best known for defeating Mike Tyson) by a TKO 30 seconds into the second round.

After a second-round TKO of Art Binkowski, Mollo faced 40-year old former world title challenger Andrew Golota. Mollo lost via unanimous decision.

One of more Mollo's more high-profile matchups was his two bouts against then-undefeated and future WBC world title challenger Artur Szpilka. Despite being a heavy underdog in the first fight and not having competed for two years prior to the bout, Mollo was able to knock down Szpilka before being knocked out in the sixth round. The two faced off again six months later, with Mollo again knocking Szpilka down early in the match before being finished in the fifth round via TKO.

Three years after his second loss to Szpilka, Mollo faced another Polish fighter, Krzysztof Zimnoch. In a significant upset, Mollo knocked out the 18-0-1 Zimnoch in the first round to win the vacant Republic of Poland International Heavyweight title. From this win, Mollo earned a shot at Andriy Rudenko's WBC Silver International Heavyweight title. Mollo was defeated via unanimous decision.

Mollo then faced off against Krzysztof Zimnoch in a rematch from the year before. Mollo lost the rematch via corner stoppage.

On March 1, 2017, Mollo officially announced his retirement from professional boxing.

Influences
Early in his career, Mollo gained the support of Rocky Marciano’s family. "I understand that Mike wants to emulate Rocky both in and out of the ring", noted Peter Marciano, younger brother of the "Brockton Blockbuster". Mollo remembers Marciano well. "I grew up watching fight films of Rocky Marciano. Both of our families came from Naples, Italy, so Rocky was a hero to my family. My strength and conditioning coach Joe Wright gave me a rare book written by Rocky called 'The Use of the Body'. Joe found this book in 1967 while he was somewhere in England. I’ve been reading it and it’s a masterpiece." Mollo continued, "I can’t be Rocky, but I’m truly honored to have the support of the Marciano family. I hope to make them proud."

Personal life
Mollo is married with children and resides in the Chicago, South Suburbs, Illinois area. He currently works in a variety of jobs, including running a boxing course and gym.

Professional boxing record

|style="text-align:center;" colspan="9"|29 fights, 21 wins (13 knockouts), 7 losses (4 knockouts),  1 draw
|- style="text-align:center; background:#e3e3e3;"
|style="border-style:none none solid solid; "|
|style="border-style:none none solid solid; "|Result
|style="border-style:none none solid solid; "|Record
|style="border-style:none none solid solid; "|Opponent
|style="border-style:none none solid solid; "|Type
|style="border-style:none none solid solid; "|Round, time
|style="border-style:none none solid solid; "|Date
|style="border-style:none none solid solid; "|Location
|style="border-style:none none solid solid; "|Notes
|-align=center
|29
|Loss
|21-7-1
|align=left| Krzysztof Zimnoch
|TKO
|(7) 10, 3:00
|25 Feb 2017
|align=left|
|align=left|
|-align=center
|28
|Loss
|21-6-1
|align=left| Andriy Rudenko
|TD
|(7) 12
|6 May 2016
|align=left|
|align=left|
|-align=center
|27
|Win
|21-5-1
|align=left| Krzysztof Zimnoch
|KO
|1 (10), 2:08
|20 Feb 2016
|align=left|
|align=left|
|-align=center
|26
|Loss
|20-5-1
|align=left| Artur Szpilka
|TKO
|5 (10), 1:41
|13 Aug 2013
|align=left|
|align=left|
|-align=center
|25
|Loss
|20-4-1
|align=left| Artur Szpilka
|KO
|6 (8), 2:45
|01 Feb 2013
|align=left|
|align=left|
|-align=center
|24
|style="background:#abcdef;"|Draw
|20-3-1
|align=left| Gary Gomez
|MD
|8
|06 Aug 2010
|align=left|
|align=left|
|-align=center
|23
|Win
|20–3
|align=left| Billy Zumbrun
|UD
|8
|26 Mar 2010
|align=left|
|align=left|
|-align=center
|22
|Loss
|19–3
|align=left| Jameel McCline
|UD
|12
|07 Nov 2008
|align=left|
|align=left|
|-align=center
|21
|Loss
|19–2
|align=left| Andrew Golota
|UD
|12
|19 Jan 2008
|align=left|
|align=left|
|-align=center
|20
|Win
|19–1
|align=left| Art Binkowski
|TKO
|2 (10), 1:25
|13 Oct 2007
|align=left|
|align=left|
|-align=center
|19
|Win
|18–1
|align=left| Zack Page
|UD
|8
|02 Mar 2007
|align=left|
|align=left|
|-align=center
|18
|Win
|17–1
|align=left| Kevin McBride
|TKO
|2 (12), 0:44
|08 Oct 2006
|align=left|
|align=left|
|-align=center
|17
|Win
|16–1
|align=left| Willie Walker
|KO
|1 (6), 0:25
|25 Aug 2006
|align=left|
|align=left|
|-align=center
|16
|Loss
|15–1
|align=left| DaVarryl Williamson
|TKO
|4 (10), 2:59
|6 May 2006
|align=left|
|align=left|
|-align=center
|15
|Win
|15–0
|align=left| Rogerio Lobo
|KO
|6 (12), 2:48
|04 Nov 2005
|align=left|
|align=left|
|-align=center
|14
|Win
|14–0
|align=left| Troy Weida
|TKO
|1 (10), 1:31
|13 Jul 2005
|align=left|
|align=left|
|-align=center
|13
|Win
|13–0
|align=left| Shawn Robinson
|TKO
|1 (6), 2:51
|27 Apr 2005
|align=left|
|align=left|
|-align=center
|12
|Win
|12–0
|align=left| Eric French
|UD
|4
|15 Jun 2004
|align=left|
|align=left|
|-align=center
|11
|Win
|11–0
|align=left| Siarhei Dychkou
|
|
|28 Mar 2003
|align=left|
|align=left|
|-align=center
|10
|Win
|10–0
|align=left| Brian McIntyre
|KO
|1 (4), 1:55
|15 Mar 2003
|align=left|
|align=left|
|-align=center
|9
|Win
|9–0
|align=left| Jessie Tucker
|UD
|6
|27 Nov 2002
|align=left|
|align=left|
|-align=center
|8
|Win
|8–0
|align=left| Marcelo Aravena
|UD
|4
|17 Nov 2002
|align=left|
|align=left|
|-align=center
|7
|Win
|7–0
|align=left| Louis Parker
|KO
|1 (4), 0:36
|27 Sep 2002
|align=left|
|align=left|
|-align=center
|6
|Win
|6–0
|align=left| John Clark
|UD
|4
|10 Aug 2002
|align=left|
|align=left|
|-align=center
|5
|Win
|5–0
|align=left| Donnie Penelton
|UD
|4
|21 Nov 2001
|align=left|
|align=left|
|-align=center
|4
|Win
|4–0
|align=left| Nathan Crawford
|KO
|1 (4), 1:00
|17 Oct 2001
|align=left|
|align=left|
|-align=center
|3
|Win
|3–0
|align=left| Calvin Miller
|KO
|1 (4), 0:38
|16 Feb 2001
|align=left|
|align=left|
|-align=center
|2
|Win
|2–0
|align=left| Joe Helton
|KO
|1 (4), 0:19
|20 Aug 2000
|align=left|
|align=left|
|-align=center
|1
|Win
|1–0
|align=left| Terrence Coffin
|KO
|1 (4), 2:03
|25 Jun 2000
|align=left|
|align=left|
|-align=center

References

External links
 
 Interview

1980 births
Living people
Heavyweight boxers
Boxers from Chicago
American male boxers
American people of Italian descent